Ria MacNutt, known professionally as Ria Mae, is a Canadian singer and songwriter from Halifax, Nova Scotia.

Career 
As a child, Mae's family moved around Halifax, switching from school to school while she learned to write songs. Ria has described herself as a teenager who spent hours in her bedroom writing songs and teaching herself how to play guitar while rarely sharing them with anyone else. "I was super shy and just kept it hidden," she says. "I used to write about relationships but I never had one. It was just imagination stuff." She wouldn't play those songs in front of a big crowd until shortly before high school graduation.

But instead of pursuing a career in music, she briefly dabbled in construction management out of high school. Before long, she would return to music, playing in bars and clubs and steadily growing a fan base.

Her first release, the EP Between the Bad, was released in 2009. Two years later, Mae was chosen as a finalist in the Mountain Stage NewSong Contest, causing her to cancel her show at the Halifax Pop Explosion.

In 2011, Mae self-released her debut album Under Your Skin, recorded with Mir members Asif and Shehab Illyas at The Shire Studios in Halifax. Mae met the Illyas brothers while acting in Rohan Fernando's feature-length independent film, Snow, in which she played an itinerant singer. The Illyas brothers composed the score for Snow. Under Your Skin won an East Coast Music Award in 2012. In March 2012, the song "Under Your Skin" was chosen as a finalist in the Radio Star National Talent Search at Canadian Music Week.

In 2013 she was nominated for another ECMA for Song of the Year for her song "Leaving Today".

The single "Clothes Off" was released in 2015 and has received positive reviews. The themes behind the song were inspired by a visit to Montreal where Mae took in the nightlife. It is her first release with Sony Music Canada. The track is produced by Juno Award-winning hip-hop producer Classified, who Mae chose after hearing his work with David Myles and Chad Hatcher. "Clothes Off" was nominated for Juno Award for Single of the Year at the Juno Awards of 2016.

Mae was nominated for Songwriter of the Year at the 2015 East Coast Music Awards.

Her self-titled album was also produced by Classified and Mae has said she doesn't think the collaboration would've come about if they weren't both from Halifax. "(Halifax) makes for some really funny collaborations," she told The Canadian Press in an interview. "If I grew up in Toronto I wouldn't necessarily be collaborating with the most famous hip-hop artist (in the city)."

Classified co-wrote and produced Mae's hit song "Thoughts On Fire" and raps on the version featuring Classified. Mae wrote "Thoughts On Fire" the day she signed with Sony Music Entertainment Canada: "Despite being told 'no' for over a year, I just never stopped believing," she said.

Mae has performed at CMJ Music Marathon in New York City, Folk Alliance International in Memphis, Canadian Music Week in Toronto, Contact East in Fredericton, and at East Coast Music Awards Week. She has shared the stage with Family of the Year, Xavier Rudd, Buck 65, Classified, and opened for Elle King.

She is out as a member of the LGBT community.

Mae is a member of Canadian charity Artists Against Racism.

Mae portrayed a lesbian relationship in the music video for her single "Gold". It would later be acknowledged as a rare example of a positive lesbian relationship in a music video that didn't "exist solely for the titillation of straight men."

The singer told The Canadian Press that she struggled with playing an alternate version of her sexuality in a music video, concerned it might pigeonhole her career. After some consideration she changed her perspective: "I had this gut feeling, like, 'Shut up. It's good, and it's important,'" she said.

Discography

Studio albums

EPs

Singles

Filmography
 Snow as an itinerant singer

References 

Canadian women singer-songwriters
Musicians from Halifax, Nova Scotia
Canadian LGBT singers
Living people
Canadian pop singers
1991 births
21st-century Canadian women singers
Canadian lesbian musicians
21st-century Canadian LGBT people